Rolf Riehm (born 15 June 1937) is a German composer who wrote stage and orchestral works as well as music for ensembles and solo instruments. He began as an oboist and music teacher and was later a professor of music theory at the Hochschule für Musik und Darstellende Kunst Frankfurt am Main for several years.

Life 
Born in Saarbrücken, Riehm first studied school music in Frankfurt am Main and from 1958 composition with Wolfgang Fortner in Freiburg im Breisgau. Afterwards he worked as a solo oboist, playing Ungebräuchliches at the Darmstädter Ferienkurse in 1966, for example. Riehm co-founded the Frankfurter Vereinigung für Musik in 1964.

In 1968 he received the award  and a scholarship from the Villa Massimo. From 1974 to 2000 Riehm was a professor for composition and music theory at the Hochschule für Musik und Darstellende Kunst Frankfurt am Main. From 1976 to 1981 he was a member of the Sogenanntes Linksradikales Blasorchester, a political wind band for which he also wrote arrangements. He did concert tours, lectures and workshops in Central and South America, Sweden and Japan.

Since 2010 he has been a member of the Academy of Arts, Berlin. His opera Sirenen had its premiere at the Oper Frankfurt in 2014. The same year, his writings were published under the title Texte.

On 27 November 2018, the Ensemble Modern held a Porträt Rolf Riehm as a Werkstattkonzert (workshop concert) in the series Happy New Ears at the Oper Frankfurt. The composer was interviewed by Klaus Zehelein, and music was performed by soprano Sarah Maria Sun and members of the Ensemble Modern, including Lenz in Moskau and Adieu, sirènes.

Works 
Riehm's compositions deal with philosophical reflection, history, myths, fairy tales, memories, and arguments in the natural sciences. They have combined elements both sublime and trivial and include socio-political findings as well as personal ingredients. His opera Sirenen, subtitled Bilder des Begehrens und des Vernichtens (Sirens, images of desire and destruction), includes text elements not only from Homer's Odyssey but also by Karoline von Günderrode, Giovanni Pascoli and Isabelle Erhardt, illuminating various aspects of the myth.

His works have been published by Ricordi, including:

Stage music 

 Das Schweigen der Sirenen (1994)
 Sirenen – Bilder des Begehrens und des Vernichtens. Premiere: Oper Frankfurt (2014).

Orchestral works 
 Die Erde ist eine Schale von dunkelm Gold (1966/1999), 2 Bach adaptations for soprano, tenor, baritone and orchestra
 Gewidmet (1976)
 He, tres doulz roussignol joly after old French ballades and virelais (1978)
 Tänze aus Frankfurt (1980)
 O Daddy (1984)
 Berceuse (1984/85)
 Das Schweigen der Sirenen (1987) for soprano, tenor, orchestra and electronic recordings
 Les Chants de la Revolution sont des Chants de l’Amour (1989, revised in 1998) for soprano, orchestra and electronic recordings
 Schubert Teilelager (1989) for string orchestra
 Odysseus aber hörte ihr Schweigen nicht (1993)
 Shifting (1995) violin concerto
 Die Tränen des Gletschers (1998)
 Archipel Remix (1999)
 Restoring the Death of Orpheus (2000) Akkordeonkonzert
 Fremdling, rede – Ballade Furor Odysseus (2002) for mezzo-soprano, speaker and orchestra
 Die schrecklich-gewaltigen Kinder (2003) for coloratura soprano and large ensemble
 Ihr, meine und eines ruchlosen Vaters (2006) for soprano, speaker (via feed) and orchestra
 Au bord d'une source (2006) for tenor recorder, orchestra and feeds
 Wer sind diese Kinder (2009) for piano, large orchestra and playback
 Die Tode des Orpheus (2017) for countertenor and orchestra

Music for ensemble 
 Uncertain Melody (1989) for eight instruments
 Double Distant Counterpoint (J. S. Bach, Kunst der Fuge, Contrapunctus XI) (1994) for large ensemble and keyboard
 Sarca – il fiume Sarca (1995) for 7 wind instruments and double bass
 Schlaf, schlaf, John Donne, schlaf tief und quäl dich nicht (1997) for violin, bass clarinet, accordion, keyboard
 Hawking (1998) for piano, bass drum and six instruments
 aprikosenbäume gibt es, aprikosenbäume gibt es (2004) for double bass clarinet, violin, trumpet, violoncello, trombone and playbacks (dedicated to Wolfgang Stryi)
 Der Faden ist gerissen (2005) for seven instrumentalists
 in der luft waren vögel, im wasser waren fische (2006) for piano and eight instruments
 Lenz in Moskau (2011) for trombone, guitar, cello, piano, two percussionists and feeds
 Pasolini in Ostia (2012) for soprano, piano, cello and percussion
 Der Asra (2014) for soprano and piano
 Basar Aleppo oder Die Straße nach Tyros (2015) Sound scenes for tenor saxophone, marimba, piano and playback
 Adieu, sirènes (2015) for mezzo-soprano, 2 cellos, 2 trumpets

Chamber music 
 Ein Sommerabend am Lindleinsee (1976) for violin, cello, piano and playbacks
 Tempo strozzato (1978) for string quartet
 "Ich denk viel." / Mr. President / pizz / 13 (1987) for viola, cello and double bass
 Gracieusement (1990) for viola, cello and double bass
 FIORETTI Within My Bosom (2000) for clarinet, cello and piano
 Short Message Piece (2001) for flute and tenor recorder
 Adieu, Marie, mon amour – Drei Liebeslieder in den Tod (2002) for viola and accordion
 No Velvet Mute For Lullabies (2005) for four trombones
 Pasolini in Ostia (2012) for soprano, piano, cello and percussion

Solo music 
 Ungebräuchliches (1964) for oboe
 Notturno für die trauerlos Sterbenden (1977) for guitar
 Don't cry, mummy isn't here anyway − memories of a temptingly morbid summer (1982) for viola
 Scheherazade (1990) for accordion
 Toccata Orpheus (1990) for guitar
 Weeds in Ophelia's Hair (1991) for alto recorder
 Push Pull (1995) for accordion
 Hamamuth – Stadt der Engel (2005) for piano
 Ach, Königin (2005) for cello
 Ton für Ton (Weiße Straßen Babylons) (2007) for double bass and clarinet
 Im Nachtigallental (2007) for cello
 So ist es (2015) for double bass and clarinet 
 Ciao, carissimo Claudio oder Die Steel Drums von San Marco (2017) for piano and playback

Discography 

 The Contemporary Accordion Teodoro Anzellotti, Koch Schwann

 Kompositionen für Gitarre, Cybele 260.601
 Dokumentation Wittener Tage für neue Kammermusik 1997, Kulturforum Witten / WDR Köln
 Sogenanntes Linksradikales Blasorchester, Trikont (1976–1981)
 Werke aus den Jahren 1977–1993 – Rundfunk-Sinfonieorchester Baden-Baden and Saarbrücken, conductors: Michael Gielen and Marcello Viotti, the guitarists Wilhelm Bruck and Theodor Ross as well as the Saarbrücken String Quartet. Talking Music TalkM 1006
 Machandelboom, Cybele SACD 960.501
 Das Schweigen der Sirenen / Tänze aus Frankfurt, hrMedia
 O Daddy, col legno
 Gewidmet, cpo
 Orchesterwerke: He, très doulz roussignol joly, Schubert Teilelager, Die Erde ist eine Schale von dunkelm Gold, Cybele 860.401
 Without Compression, Cybele 260.501
 Weeds in Ophelia’s Hair, Bayer-Records
 aprikosenbäume gibt es, aprikosenbäume gibt es (Theo Nabicht, ensemble ascolta) and two other works: ahi bocca, ahi lingua (Hilliard Ensemble) and schlaf, schlaf, John donne, schlaf tief und quäl dich nicht (ensemble recherche), Cybele records SACD 860.701
 Rolf Riehm Orchesterwerke: Die Tränen des Gletschers, Nuages immortels oder Focusing on Solos (Medea in Avignon) and Berceuse, SWR Sinfonie Orchester, Michael Gielen, Hans Zender, telos music records TLS 128
Rolf Riehm: Wer sind diese Kinder, Hamamuth-Stadt der Engel, Nicolas Hodges, piano, SWR Sinfonieorchester Baden-Baden und Freiburg, Beat Furrer, WERGO 6755 2
 Rolf Riehm: Lenz in Moskau, Im Nachtigallental, Ton für Ton (weiße Straßen Babylons), Au bord d’une source, Ensemble Ascolta, Erik Borgir, Theo Nabicht, Jeremias Schwarzer, hr-Sinfonieorchester, Sian Edwards, WERGO 73142
 Shifting, Guy Braunstein, violin, WDR Sinfonieorchester Köln, conductor Dennis Russell Davies, Archipel Remix, WDR Sinfonieorchester Köln, conductor Peter Rundel, WERGO 7357 2

Bibliography 
 Rolf Riehm: Texte. Published by Marion Saxer (Edition Neue Zeitschrift für Musik). Schott, Mainz 2014, .
 Hans-Klaus Jungheinrich (editor): In anderen Räumen – Der Komponist Rolf Riehm (Edition Neue Zeitschrift für Musik). Schott, Mainz 2015, .

References

External links 
 
 
 Rolf-Riehm-Archiv Academy of Arts, Berlin
 Rolf Riehm (related articles) Neue Musikzeitung
 
 

1937 births
20th-century German composers
Academic staff of the Frankfurt University of Music and Performing Arts
German classical oboists
German opera composers
Living people
Male oboists
Male opera composers
Members of the Academy of Arts, Berlin
People from Saarbrücken
20th-century German male musicians